SAP ERP is an enterprise resource planning software developed by the German company SAP SE. SAP ERP incorporates the key business functions of an organization. The latest version of SAP ERP (V.6.0) was made available in 2006. The most recent SAP enhancement package 8 for SAP ERP 6.0 was released in 2016. It is now considered legacy technology, having been superseded by SAP S/4HANA.

Functionality 
Business Processes included in SAP ERP are:
 Operations  (Sales & Distribution, Materials Management, Production Planning, Logistics Execution, and Quality Management),
 Financials (Financial Accounting, Management Accounting, Financial Supply Chain Management),
 Human Capital Management (Training, Payroll, e-Recruiting) and
 Corporate Services (Travel Management, Environment, Health and Safety, and Real-Estate Management).

Development 

An ERP was built based on the former SAP R/3 software. SAP R/3, which was officially launched on 6 July 1992, consisted of various applications on top of SAP Basis, SAP's set of middleware programs and tools. All applications were built on top of the SAP Web Application Server. Extension sets were used to deliver new features and keep the core as stable as possible. The Web Application Server contained all the capabilities of SAP Basis.

An architecture change took place with the introduction of mySAP ERP in 2004. R/3 Enterprise was replaced with the introduction of ERP Central Component (SAP ECC). The SAP Business Warehouse, SAP Strategic Enterprise Management and Internet Transaction Server were also merged into SAP ECC, allowing users to run them under one instance. The SAP Web Application Server was wrapped into SAP NetWeaver, which was introduced in 2003. Architectural changes were also made to support an enterprise service architecture to transition customers to a Service-oriented architecture.

The latest version, SAP ERP 6.0, was released in 2006. SAP ERP 6.0 has since then been updated through SAP enhancement packs, the most recent: SAP enhancement package 8 for SAP ERP 6.0 was released in 2016.

Implementation 
SAP ERP consists of several modules, including Financial Accounting (FI), Controlling (CO), Asset Accounting (AA), Sales & Distribution (SD),SAP Customer Relationship Management (SAP CRM), Material Management (MM), Production Planning (PP), Quality Management (QM), Project System (PS), Plant Maintenance (PM), Human Resources (HR), Warehouse Management (WM). Traditionally an implementation is split into:
 Phase 1 – Project Preparation
 Phase 2 – Business Blueprint
 Phase 3 – Realization
 Phase 4 – Final Preparation
 Phase 5 – Go Live Support

Deployment and maintenance costs 
It is estimated that "for a Fortune 500 company, software, hardware, and consulting costs can easily exceed $100 million (around $50 million to $500 million). Large companies can also spend $50 million to $100 million on upgrades. Full implementation of all modules can take years", which also adds to the end price. Midsized companies (fewer than 1,000 employees) are more likely to spend around $10 million to $20 million at most, and small companies are not likely to have the need for a fully integrated SAP ERP system unless they have the likelihood of becoming midsized and then the same data applies as would a midsized company.
Independent studies have shown that deployment and maintenance costs of a SAP solution can vary depending on the organization. For example, some point out that because of the rigid model imposed by SAP tools, a lot of customization code to adapt to the business process may have to be developed and maintained. Some others pointed out that a return on investment could only be obtained when there was both a sufficient number of users and sufficient frequency of use.

SAP Transport Management System
SAP Transport Management System (STMS) is a tool within SAP ERP systems to manage software updates, termed transports, on one or more connected SAP systems. The tool can be accessed from transaction code STMS. This should not be confused with SAP Transportation Management, a stand-alone module for facilitating logistics and supply chain management in the transportation of goods and materials.

SAP Enhancement Packages for SAP ERP 6.0 (SAP EhPs)
The latest version (SAP ERP 6.0) was made available in 2006. Since then, additional functionality for SAP ERP 6.0 has been delivered through SAP Enhancement Packages (EhP).
These Enhancement Packages allow SAP ERP customers to manage and deploy new software functionality. Enhancement Packages are optional; customers choose which new capabilities to implement.

SAP EhPs do not require a classic system upgrade.
The installation process of Enhancement Packages consists of two different steps:
 Technical installation of an Enhancement Package
 Activation of new functions
The technical installation of business functions does not change the system behavior. The installation of new functionalities is decoupled from its activation and companies can choose which business functions they want to activate. This means that even after installing a new business function, there is no change to existing functionality before activation. Activating a business function for one process will have no effect on users working with other functionalities.
EhP8 served as a foundation to transition to SAP's new business suite: SAP S/4HANA.

See also 
GuiXT
List of ERP software packages
SAP NetWeaver
SAP GUI
SOA
Secure Network Communications
Secure Sockets Layer
T-code
UK & Ireland SAP Users Group

References

Sources 

 Odell, Laura A., Brendan T. Farrar-Foley, John R. Kinkel, Rama S. Moorthy, and Jennifer A. Schultz. “History and Current Status of ERP Systems in DoD.” Beyond Enterprise Resource Planning (ERP): The Next Generation Enterprise Resource Planning Environment. Institute for Defense Analyses, 2012. 
 Jerry Rolia, Giuliano Casale, Diwakar Krishnamurthy, Stephen Dawson, and Stephan Kraft. 2009. Predictive modelling of SAP ERP applications: challenges and solutions. In Proceedings of the Fourth International ICST Conference on Performance Evaluation Methodologies and Tools (VALUETOOLS '09). ICST (Institute for Computer Sciences, Social Informatics and Telecommunications Engineering), Brussels, BEL, Article 9, 1–9. 
 Al-Sabri, H.M., Al-Mashari, M. and Chikh, A. (2018), "A comparative study and evaluation of ERP reference models in the context of ERP IT-driven implementation: SAP ERP as a case study", Business Process Management Journal, Vol. 24 No. 4, pp. 943-964. 
 
 Gargeya, V.B. and Brady, C. (2005), "Success and failure factors of adopting SAP in ERP system implementation", Business Process Management Journal, Vol. 11 No. 5, pp. 501-516. 
 Hufgard A., Gerhardt E. (2011) Consolidating Business Processes as Exemplified in SAP ERP Systems. In: Schmidt W. (eds) S-BPM ONE - Learning by Doing - Doing by Learning. S-BPM ONE 2011. Communications in Computer and Information Science, vol 213. Springer, Berlin, Heidelberg. 
 R. R. Savchuk and N. A. Kirsta, "Managing of the Business Processes in Enterprise by Moving to SAP ERP System," 2019 Institute of Electrical and Electronics Engineers Conference of Russian Young Researchers in Electrical and Electronic Engineering (EIConRus), 2019, pp. 1467-1470, 
 
 In White Paper Review, Industry Week OCT 2009, ‘ERP Best Practices: The SaaS Difference, Plex Systems, Retrieved 21/04/2012.
 
 
 Shim, Sung J. and Minsuk K. Shim. “Effects of user perceptions of SAP ERP system on user learning and skills.” Journal of Computing in Higher Education 32 (2020): 41-56. . .
 Angolia, Mark and Leslie Pagliari. “Experiential Learning for Logistics and Supply Chain Management Using an SAP ERP Software Simulation.” Decision Sciences Journal of Innovative Education 16 (2018): 104-125. . .
 Lorenc, Augustyn and Maciej Szkoda. “Customer logistic service in the automotive industry with the use of the SAP ERP system.” 2015 4th International Conference on Advanced Logistics and Transport (ICALT) (2015): 18-23. . .
 Al-Sabri, Hamdan Mohammed, Majed A. Al-Mashari and Azeddine Chikh. “A comparative study and evaluation of ERP reference models in the context of ERP IT-driven implementation: SAP ERP as a case study.” Bus. Process. Manag. J. 24 (2018): 943-964. . .
 Vlasov, Vladimir, Victoria Chebotareva, Marat Rakhimov and Sergey Kruglikov. “AI User Support System for SAP ERP.” (2017). . .
 Gottschalk, Friederike. "Validation of SAP R/3 and Other ERP Systems: Methodology and Tools." Pharmaceutical Technology Europe, vol. 12, no. 12, Dec. 2000, p. 26. Gale Academic OneFile, . Accessed 26 Jan. 2022.
 VAN EVERDINGEN, YVONNE, et al. "ERP ADOPTION BY EUROPEAN MIDSIZE COMPANIES." Communications of the ACM, vol. 43, no. 4, Apr. 2000, p. 27. Gale Academic OneFile, . Accessed 26 Jan. 2022.
 Lui, Kim Man, and Keith C.C. Chan. "Capability maturity model and SAP: toward a universal ERP implementation model." International Journal of Enterprise Information Systems, vol. 1, no. 3, July-Sept. 2005, pp. 69+. Gale Academic OneFile, . Accessed 26 Jan. 2022.
 Laosethakul, Kittipong, and Thaweephan Leingpibul. "Investigating Student Perceptions and Behavioral Intention to Use Multimedia Teaching Methods for the SAP ERP System." e-Journal of Business Education and Scholarship Teaching, vol. 15, no. 1, June 2021, pp. 1+. Gale Academic OneFile, . Accessed 26 Jan. 2022.
 
 
 
 
 
 J. Nađ and M. Vražić, "Decision making in transformer manufacturing companies with help of ERP business software," 2017 15th International Conference on Electrical Machines, Drives and Power Systems (ELMA), 2017, pp. 379-382, .
 C. F. Vera, R. T. Carmona, J. Armas-Aguirre and A. B. Padilla, "Technological architecture to consume On-Premise ERP services from a hybrid cloud platform," 2019 IEEE XXVI International Conference on Electronics, Electrical Engineering and Computing (INTERCON), 2019, pp. 1-4, .
 R. R. Savchuk and N. A. Kirsta, "Managing of the Business Processes in Enterprise by Moving to SAP ERP System," 2019 IEEE Conference of Russian Young Researchers in Electrical and Electronic Engineering (EIConRus), 2019, pp. 1467-1470, .
 Sung J. Shim and Minsuk K. Shim. 2018. How user perceptions of SAP ERP system change with system experience. In Proceedings of the First International Conference on Data Science, E-learning and Information Systems (DATA '18). Association for Computing Machinery, New York, NY, USA, Article 20, 1–4. 
 Pliskin, Nava, and Marta Zarotski. "Big-bang ERP implementation at a global company." Journal of Cases on Information Technology, vol. 2, annual 2000. Gale Academic OneFile, . Accessed 26 Jan. 2022.
 Wang, John. "Sankar, Chetan S., Karl-Heinz Rau. 2006. Implementation Strategies for SAP R/3 in a Multinational Organization: Lessons from a Real-World Case Study." Interfaces, vol. 38, no. 4, July-Aug. 2008, pp. 347+. Gale Academic OneFile, . Accessed 26 Jan. 2022.
 Leyh, Christian. "Teaching ERP systems: results of a survey at research-oriented universities and universities of applied sciences in Germany." Journal of Information Systems Education, vol. 23, no. 2, summer 2012, pp. 217+. Gale Academic OneFile, . Accessed 26 Jan. 2022.
 Qiu, Manying, et al. "TO CLOSE THE SKILLS GAP, TECHNOLOGY AND HIGHER-ORDER THINKING SKILLS MUST GO HAND IN HAND." Journal of International Technology and Information Management, vol. 29, no. 1, Jan. 2020, pp. COV5+. Gale Academic OneFile, . Accessed 26 Jan. 2022.
 Cronan, Timothy Paul, and David E. Douglas. "Assessing ERP learning (management, business process, and skills) and attitudes." Journal of Organizational and End User Computing, vol. 25, no. 2, Apr.-June 2013, pp. 59+. Gale Academic OneFile, . Accessed 26 Jan. 2022.
 de Souza, Cesar Alexandre, and Ronaldo Zwicker. "Capabilities and actors in ERP systems management: an exploratory study in corporate users of SAP ERP/capacidades e atores na gestao de sistemas ERP: um estudo exploratorio entre usuarios corporativos do ERP da SAP." Journal of Information Systems & Technology Management, vol. 4, no. 2, Apr. 2007, pp. 197+. Gale Academic OneFile, . Accessed 26 Jan. 2022.
 ROBSON, SEAN. “PROJECT CONCEPTION.” In Agile SAP: Introducing Flexibility, Transparency and Speed to SAP Implementations, 33–52. IT Governance Publishing 2013. .
 Seddon, Peter B., et al. “A Multi-Project Model of Key Factors Affecting Organizational Benefits from Enterprise Systems.” MIS Quarterly, vol. 34, no. 2, Management Information Systems Research Center, University of Minnesota, 2010, pp. 305–28, .
 
 I. Tereshchenko, S. Shtangey and A. Tereshchenko, "The application SAP® ERP principles for the development and implementation of corporate integrated information system for SME," 2016 Third International Scientific-Practical Conference Problems of Infocommunications Science and Technology (PIC S&T), 2016, pp. 168-170, .
 Usmanij, P.A., Khosla, R. & Chu, MT. Successful product or successful system? User satisfaction measurement of ERP software. J Intell Manuf 24, 1131–1144 (2013). 
 Diptikalyan Saha, Neelamadhav Gantayat, Senthil Mani, and Barry Mitchell. 2017. Natural language querying in SAP-ERP platform. In Proceedings of the 2017 11th Joint Meeting on Foundations of Software Engineering (ESEC/FSE 2017). Association for Computing Machinery, New York, NY, USA, 878–883. 
 T. Orosz, "Analysis of SAP Development tools and methods," 2011 15th IEEE International Conference on Intelligent Engineering Systems, 2011, pp. 439-443, .

External links 
 

ERP software
Computer-related introductions in 1972
Cloud applications
Cloud platforms
Automation software
Accounting software
Project management software
Enterprise software
Business software
Human resource management software
Customer relationship management software
ERP